Anders Sandberg (born 27 July 1953) is a Swedish former backstroke swimmer. He competed in three events at the 1972 Summer Olympics.

References

External links
 

1953 births
Living people
Swedish male backstroke swimmers
Olympic swimmers of Sweden
Swimmers at the 1972 Summer Olympics
People from Eskilstuna
Sportspeople from Södermanland County
20th-century Swedish people